Kim Kuk-hyang ( or  ; born 20 April 1993) is a North Korean weightlifter who won the silver medal in the women's +75 kg weight class at the 2015 Asian Weightlifting Championships.

She won the silver medal at the women's +75 kg event at the 2016 Summer Olympics.

Kuk-hyang was born in Changyon County, South Hwanghae Province, North Korea. She was raised by her mother and was later orphaned, to be raised by the state. She was noticed by weightlifting coach Kim Myong Ho at a hospital in Pyongyang when helping her mother get medical treatment; she was helping her mother up the stairs when the coach asked if she wanted to become a weightlifter. As her mother's health was failing, the coach would often visit her in hospital and promised to raise her daughter. Myong Ho was a demanding coach who also acted as her father. At age 16, she was injured as the first world junior weight lifting championship neared. After recuperating, she was looked after by national-level coaches and a medical group, who oversaw her nutrition using a scientific approach. She was chosen one of the top ten athletes of 2016 and was awarded the title of "Merited Athlete" in her home country.

References

Living people
1993 births
World Weightlifting Championships medalists
Olympic weightlifters of North Korea
Olympic silver medalists for North Korea
Medalists at the 2016 Summer Olympics
Weightlifters at the 2016 Summer Olympics
Olympic medalists in weightlifting
North Korean female weightlifters
Universiade medalists in weightlifting
Asian Games medalists in weightlifting
Weightlifters at the 2018 Asian Games
Medalists at the 2018 Asian Games
Asian Games gold medalists for North Korea
Universiade gold medalists for North Korea
20th-century North Korean women
21st-century North Korean women